Veikko Juhani Vallin (born 15 May 1962 in Tampere) is a Finnish politician and businessman. He is currently serving in the Parliament of Finland for the Finns Party at the Pirkanmaa constituency.

References

1961 births
Living people
Politicians from Tampere
Finns Party politicians
Members of the Parliament of Finland (2019–23)
20th-century Finnish businesspeople